The Borden House is a historic house on the grounds of Prairie Grove Battlefield State Park in Prairie Grove, Arkansas. In the Battle of Prairie Grove on December 7, 1862, the original Borden House was one of the central points of the Confederate line, and was the scene of heavy casualties.  The Borden House was burned the next day. Archibald Borden built the current house on the original site.  It is a -story wood-frame house, five bays wide, with a side-gable roof pierced by three gabled dormers.  A porch extends across the center three bays of the front.

The house was listed on the National Register of Historic Places in 1977, and included in an enlarged National Register listing for the battlefield in 1992.

See also
National Register of Historic Places listings in Washington County, Arkansas

References

Houses on the National Register of Historic Places in Arkansas
Houses in Washington County, Arkansas
1862 establishments in Arkansas
National Register of Historic Places in Washington County, Arkansas
Historic district contributing properties in Arkansas
Houses completed in 1862
Individually listed contributing properties to historic districts on the National Register in Arkansas